Davud Rashid (also Romanized as Dāvūd Rashīd; also known as Dāvūd Rashīd Mīrīān, Dāvodrash, Dāyūrāsh, and Dāyvrāsh) is a village in Kuhdasht-e Jonubi Rural District, in the Central District of Kuhdasht County, Lorestan Province, Iran. At the 2006 census, its population was 721, in 153 families.

References 

Towns and villages in Kuhdasht County